Homalocantha anatomica (common name: "Pele's Murex" or "Anatomical Murex") is a species of sea snail, a marine gastropod mollusk in the family Muricidae, the murex snails or rock snails.

Taxonomy
 Subspecies Homalocantha anatomica anatomica Perry, 1811
 Subspecies Homalocantha anatomica elatensis Heiman & Mienis, 2009 : synonym of Homalocantha elatensis Heiman & Mienis, 2009
 Subspecies Homalocantha anatomica pele H. A. Pilsbry, 1921
 Variety Homalocantha anatomica var. zamboi Burch & Burch, 1960 : synonym of  Homalocantha zamboi (Burch & Burch, 1960)

Distribution
This species occurs in the Red Sea and throughout the Indo-Western Pacific, from Japan, Philippines and Fiji to the Hawaiian Islands.

Description
Adult shell size of Homalocantha anatomica varies between 38 mm and 63 mm. These shells are solid, whitish in color, sometimes tinted with yellow or red and moderately light in weight, with five to six varices per whorl. Aperture is small and white or pink. Labial lip shows irregular denticles.  Columella is smooth and siphonal canal is moderately long.

Biology
These sea snails feed primarily on boring mussels in reef rocks.

References

External links
 Natural History Museum Rotterdam
 Jousseaume, F. (1888). Description des mollusques recueillis par M. le Dr. Faurot dans la Mer Rouge et le Golfe d'Aden. Mémoires de la Société Zoologique de France. 1: 165-223

Bibliography
 Jousseaume, F., 1888. Description des mollusques recueillis par M. le Dr Faurot dans la Mer Rouge et le Golfe d'Aden. Mémoires de la Société Zoologique de France 1: 165-223
 A.G. Hinton - Guide to Shells of Papua New Guinea
 Abbott and Dance (1982). "Compendium of Seashells"
 Drivas, J.; Jay, M. (1987). Coquillages de La Réunion et de l'Île Maurice. Collection Les Beautés de la Nature. Delachaux et Niestlé: Neuchâtel. . 159 pp.
 F. Springsteen and F. M. Leobrera - Shells of the Philippines
 George E. Radwin - Murex Shells of the World - An Illustrated Guide to the Muricidae
 Hirofumi Kubo and Taiji Kurozumi - Molluscs of Okinawa
 Severns, M. (2000). "Hawaiian Seashells"
 Liu, J.Y. [Ruiyu] (ed.). (2008). Checklist of marine biota of China seas. China Science Press. 1267 pp
 Houart R., Gori S. & Rosado J. (2017). The Muricidae (Gastropoda: Muricoidea) from Oman with the description of four new species. Novapex. 18(3): 41-69

Muricidae
Gastropods described in 1811